Isaac (Ike) Anderson is a former United States Olympic athlete who competed in Greco-Roman wrestling and was a former Greco-Roman developmental coach for USA Wrestling.

Anderson was 6th at the 1988 Summer Olympics in Seoul, South Korea in Greco-Roman wrestling (62 kg). Anderson won three U.S. National titles in Greco-Roman wrestling, was a national runner-up four times, and took silver at 62 kg at the 1991 Pan American Games in Havana, Cuba.

Anderson attended Appalachian State University where he qualified for the NCAA Championships and earned degrees in recreation and physical education.  Anderson also wrestled for Broward Community College. In 1990, he was inducted into Appalachian State Athletics Hall of Fame.

References 

Living people
Wrestlers at the 1988 Summer Olympics
American male sport wrestlers
Olympic wrestlers of the United States
Appalachian State University alumni
Pan American Games silver medalists for the United States
Pan American Games medalists in wrestling
1957 births
Wrestlers at the 1991 Pan American Games
Medalists at the 1991 Pan American Games